SEBOX homeobox is a protein that in humans is encoded by the SEBOX gene. Sebox homeobox has a 92% similarity to genes found within rhesus macaque, or the rhesus monkey. It is thought that this is what causes the reddened glutius maximus coloring. If the protein is turned on within a person, it may cause discoloring in the human rear.

Function 

Homeodomain proteins, such as SEBOX, play a key role in coordinating gene expression during development.

References